Norman Gene Macdonald (October 17, 1959September 14, 2021) was a Canadian stand-up comedian, actor, and writer whose style was characterized by deadpan delivery and the use of folksy, old-fashioned turns of phrase. He appeared in many films and was a regular guest on late-night talk shows, where he became known for his chaotic, yet understated style of comedy. Many critics and fellow comedians considered him to be the ultimate talk show guest.

Earlier in his career, Macdonald's first work on television included writing for such comedies as Roseanne and The Dennis Miller Show. In 1993, Macdonald was hired as a writer and cast member on Saturday Night Live (SNL), spending a total of five seasons on the series, which included anchoring the show's Weekend Update segment for three and a half seasons. He was removed as host of SNLs Weekend Update in 1998, allegedly for relentlessly mocking O. J. Simpson during his murder trial, offending producer Don Ohlmeyer who was a close friend of Simpson. After being fired from SNL, he wrote and starred in the 1998 film Dirty Work and headlined his own sitcom The Norm Show from 1999 to 2001. Macdonald was also a voice actor, and provided voice acting roles for Family Guy, The Fairly OddParents, Mike Tyson Mysteries, The Orville, and the Dr. Dolittle films.

Between 2013 and 2018, Macdonald hosted the talk shows Norm Macdonald Live (a video podcast) and Norm Macdonald Has a Show (a Netflix series), on which he interviewed comedians and other celebrities. In 2016, he authored Based on a True Story, a novel that presented a heavily fictionalized account of his life. Macdonald died of leukemia in September 2021, a condition he had not publicly disclosed.

Early life
Norm Macdonald was born in Quebec City, Quebec. His parents, Ferne (née Mains) and Percy Lloyd Macdonald (1916–1990), were both Anglophone teachers. They worked at CFB Valcartier, a military base north of Quebec City. As a child, his father would not let him learn French as he wanted the family to speak English. Macdonald's father died in 1990 of heart disease.

He attended Quebec High School before his family moved to Ottawa, Ontario. In Ottawa, Macdonald attended Gloucester High School. He claimed to have dropped out at sixteen, but may in fact have graduated two years early.  He studied mathematics at Carleton University in Ottawa before dropping out. Macdonald was later also briefly enrolled in Algonquin College's programs for journalism and broadcasting-television, following his elder brother Neil Macdonald's footsteps. He worked a variety of manual labor jobs in between periods of school and before starting in comedy.

He is survived by an older brother, Neil Macdonald, who was a journalist with CBC News (and is married to Joyce Napier, a journalist with CTV News), his younger brother (Leslie), his son (Dylan), and his mother (Ferne).

Career
Macdonald's first performances in comedy were at stand-up clubs in Ottawa, regularly appearing on amateur nights at Yuk Yuk's in 1985. He did not appreciate how well his first performance at the club had gone, and he bolted out, saying he would never do it again. The club's owner, Howard Wagman, had to persuade him to come back for more. Eventually his confidence grew. Six months later he performed at the 1986 Just For Laughs Comedy Festival in Montreal, and he was heralded by the Montreal Gazette as "one of this country's hottest comics." By 1990, he would perform as a contestant on Star Search. He also appeared on Late Night with David Letterman, and the host became a huge fan, saying: "If we could have, we would have had Norm on every week". He was hired as a writer for television sitcom Roseanne for the 1992–93 season before quitting to join Saturday Night Live.

1993–1998: Saturday Night Live
Macdonald joined the cast of NBC's Saturday Night Live (SNL) television program in 1993, where he performed impressions of Larry King, Burt Reynolds, David Letterman, Quentin Tarantino, Charles Kuralt, and Bob Dole, among others. The following year, during the show's twentieth season, Macdonald anchored the news satire segment Weekend Update.

His version of Weekend Update often included references to prison rape, crack whores, and the Germans' love of Baywatch star David Hasselhoff. He would occasionally deliver a piece of news before taking out his personal compact tape recorder and leaving a "note to self" relevant to what he just discussed. He commonly used Frank Stallone as a non-sequitur punchline.

On the Weekend Update aired on 24 February 1996, Macdonald joked about John Lotter's sentencing:

And finally, in Falls City, Nebraska, John Lotter has been sentenced to death for attempting to kill three people in what prosecutors called a plot to silence a cross-dressing female who had accused him of rape. Now, this might strike some viewers as harsh but I believe everyone involved in this story should die.

The comments were met with sharp criticism from trans and queer communities and organisations including The Transexual Menace, who threatened to picket SNL in the absence of an apology. Upon reviewing the show, NBC agreed the line was inappropriate and should not have aired, and said it would ensure that similar incidents would not happen in the future.

After the announcement that Michael Jackson and Lisa Marie Presley planned to divorce, Macdonald joked about their irreconcilable differences on Weekend Update. "According to friends, the two were never a good match. She's more of a stay-at-home type, and he's more of a homosexual pedophile." He followed this up a few episodes later with a report about the singer's collapse and hospitalization. Referring to a report of how Jackson had decorated his hospital room with giant photographs of Shirley Temple, Macdonald added: "But don't get any ideas: Michael Jackson is a homosexual pedophile."

Leaving Saturday Night Live
In early 1998, Don Ohlmeyer, president of NBC's West Coast division, had Macdonald removed as Weekend Update anchor, citing a decline in ratings and a drop-off in quality. He was replaced by Colin Quinn at the Weekend Update desk beginning on the January 10, 1998, episode.

Macdonald believed at the time that the true reason for his dismissal was his series of O. J. Simpson jokes during and after the trial, frequently calling him a murderer; Ohlmeyer was a good friend of Simpson and supported him during the proceedings. After being removed from the role, Macdonald went on CBS's Late Show with David Letterman and Howard Stern's syndicated radio show; in both appearances, the hosts accused Ohlmeyer of firing him for making jokes about Simpson. The jokes were written primarily by Macdonald and longtime SNL writer Jim Downey, who was fired from SNL at the same time. Downey pointed out in an interview that Ohlmeyer threw a party for the jurors who acquitted Simpson.

Ohlmeyer claimed that Macdonald was mistaken, pointing out he had not censored Jay Leno's many jokes about Simpson on The Tonight Show. Ohlmeyer stated he was concerned that ratings research showed people turning away from the program during Macdonald's segment; likewise, network insiders told the New York Daily News that Ohlmeyer and other executives had tried several times to get Macdonald to try a different approach on Update.

Macdonald remained on SNL as a cast member, but he disliked performing in regular sketches. On February 28, 1998, in one of his last appearances on SNL, he played the host of a fictitious TV series titled Who's More Grizzled? who asked questions from "mountain men", played by that night's host Garth Brooks and special guest Robert Duvall. In the sketch, Brooks's character says to Macdonald's character, "I don't much care for you," to which Macdonald replies, "A lot of people don't." He was dismissed shortly thereafter.

Matters intensified when Ohlmeyer prevented NBC from airing advertisements from Metro-Goldwyn-Mayer for Macdonald's then-new film Dirty Work out of retaliation for what he saw as disparaging SNL and NBC with Letterman and Stern. Robert Wright, Ohlmeyer's boss, later overturned the decision not to show ads for the movie on NBC, but did leave in place the ban on playing it during SNL. Macdonald continued to insist that he did not personally dislike Ohlmeyer but that Ohlmeyer hated him.

Macdonald complained about NBC's advertising removal for his film to the New York Daily News, calling Ohlmeyer a "liar and a thug." He said he never badmouthed SNL or Michaels, who he said always supported him. Macdonald pointed out that he had only taken issue with Ohlmeyer, whereas the people taking shots at NBC and SNL were Letterman, who wanted Macdonald to come to CBS, and Stern, who wanted him to join his show opposite SNL. Macdonald also asserted that Ohlmeyer's influence resulted in cancellation of promotional appearances for his film on WNBC's Today in New York, NBC's Late Night with Conan O'Brien, and the syndicated Access Hollywood (a joint venture between 20th Century Television and NBC). The shows that Macdonald named denied being influenced by Ohlmeyer. Macdonald said Ohlmeyer was "about a thousand times more powerful than I am. It's difficult for anybody to take my side in this. This guy should get a life, man."

Members of the media found irony in the situation, as Dirty Work was promoted as a "revenge comedy." When an interviewer pointed this out, Macdonald said: "It would be good revenge if everybody went and saw this movie if they want to get revenge against Don Ohlmeyer for trying to ban my ads." In a Late Show with David Letterman interview, Macdonald stated that after being dismissed from anchoring Weekend Update and leaving SNL, he could not "do anything else on any competing show."

In later years, he came to the conclusion that Ohlmeyer had not removed him from Update for his Simpson material; rather, he felt he was removed because he was seen as insubordinate: "I think the whole show was tired of me not taking marching orders. Lorne would hint at things... I'd do Michael Jackson jokes. And Lorne would say, 'do you really want a lawsuit from Michael Jackson?' And I'd say, 'Cool! That'd be fuckin' cool, Michael Jackson suing me!'" Elsewhere, Macdonald would concede, "In all fairness to him, my Update was not an audience[-]pleasing, warm kind of thing. I did jokes that I knew weren't going to get bigger reactions. So I saw [Ohlmeyer's] point. Why would you want some dude who's not trying to please the audience?"

Macdonald returned to Saturday Night Live to host the October 23, 1999, show. In his opening monologue, he expressed resentment at being fired from Weekend Update, and then he concluded that the only reason he was asked to host was because "the show has gotten really bad" since he left, echoing a perennial criticism of the show.

1998–1999: Dirty Work and The Norm Show
Soon after leaving Saturday Night Live, Macdonald co-wrote and starred in the "revenge comedy" Dirty Work (1998), directed by Bob Saget, co-starring Artie Lange, and featuring Chris Farley in his last film; the film was dedicated to his memory. Later that year, Macdonald voiced Lucky in the Eddie Murphy adaptation of Dr. Dolittle. He reprised the role in both Dr. Dolittle 2 (2001) and Dr. Dolittle 3 (2006).

In 1999, Macdonald starred in The Norm Show (later renamed Norm), co-starring Laurie Metcalf, Artie Lange, and Ian Gomez. It ran for three seasons on ABC. Earlier in 1999, he made a cameo appearance in the Andy Kaufman biographical drama Man on the Moon, directed by Miloš Forman. When Michael Richards refused to portray himself in the scene reenacting the famous Fridays incident in which Kaufman threw water in his face, Macdonald stepped in to play Richards, although he was not referred to by name. Macdonald also appeared in Forman's previous film The People vs. Larry Flynt (1996) as a reporter summoned to Flynt's mansion regarding secret tapes involving automaker John DeLorean.

2000–2005
In 2000, Macdonald played the starring role for the second time in a motion picture alongside Dave Chappelle, Screwed, which fared poorly at the box office. He continued to make appearances on television shows and in films. Also in 2000, Macdonald made his first appearance on Family Guy, as the voice of Death. That role was later recast to Adam Carolla. On November 12, 2000, he appeared on the Celebrity Edition of Who Wants to Be a Millionaire?, winning $500,000 for Paul Newman's Hole in the Wall Charity Camp, but could have won the million if he had ignored the advice of host Regis Philbin.

In 2003, Macdonald played the title character in the Fox sitcom A Minute with Stan Hooper, which was cancelled after six episodes. In 2005, Macdonald signed a deal with Comedy Central to create the sketch comedy Back to Norm, which debuted that May. The pilot, whose cold opening parodied the suicide of Budd Dwyer, featured as a cast member Rob Schneider and never turned into a series. Later in 2005, Macdonald voiced a genie named Norm on the Nickelodeon cartoon series The Fairly OddParents.

2006–2009

In 2006, Macdonald again performed as a voice actor, this time in a series of commercials for the Canadian mobile-services provider Bell Mobility, as the voice of Frank the Beaver. The campaign was extended through 2008 to promote offerings from other Bell Canada divisions such as the Internet provider Bell Sympatico and the satellite service Bell Satellite TV. In September 2006, Macdonald's sketch comedy album Ridiculous was released by Comedy Central Records. It features appearances by Will Ferrell, Jon Lovitz, Tim Meadows, Molly Shannon, and Artie Lange. On the comedy website Super Deluxe, he created an animated series entitled The Fake News. Macdonald  filled in during Dennis Miller's weekly "Miller Time" segment on O'Reilly Factor, and guest-hosted Miller's radio show, on which he was briefly a weekly contributor.

Macdonald was a guest character on My Name Is Earl in the episode "Two Balls, Two Strikes" (2007) as Lil Chubby, the son of "Chubby" (played by Burt Reynolds), similar to Macdonald's portrayals of Reynolds on SNL. On June 19, 2008, Macdonald was a celebrity panellist on two episodes of a revived version of the game show Match Game. On August 17, 2008, Macdonald was a participant in the Comedy Central Roast of Bob Saget, performing intentionally cheesy and G-rated material that contrasted greatly with the raunchy performances of the other roasters.<ref>{{cite news | title=Norm Macdonald's roast of Bob Saget remembered as 'one of the most brilliant pieces of comedy ever|website=Independent.co.uk|date=September 15, 2021|url=https://www.independent.co.uk/arts-entertainment/tv/news/norm-macdonald-bob-saget-roast-b1920258.html |archive-url=https://ghostarchive.org/archive/20220621/https://www.independent.co.uk/arts-entertainment/tv/news/norm-macdonald-bob-saget-roast-b1920258.html |archive-date=June 21, 2022 |url-access=subscription |url-status=live|access-date=September 15, 2021}}</ref> In AT&T commercials around Christmas 2007 and 2008, Macdonald voiced a gingerbread boy in a commercial for AT&T's GoPhone.

In 2009, Macdonald and Sam Simon pitched a fake reality show to FX called The Norm Macdonald Reality Show where Macdonald would play a fictional, down-on-his-luck version of himself. The show was picked up and Garry Shandling was added to the cast, but it was cancelled halfway through filming. On the May 16, 2009, episode of Saturday Night Live, Macdonald reappeared as Burt Reynolds on Celebrity Jeopardy!, and in another sketch. On May 31, 2009, he appeared on Million Dollar Password.

2010–2012
Macdonald became a frequent guest on The Tonight Show with Conan O'Brien during its 2009 and 2010 run. He made frequent appearances on the Internet talk show Tom Green's House Tonight, and on May 20, 2010, was guest host.

In September 2010, Macdonald was developing a series for Comedy Central that he described as a sports version of The Daily Show. Sports Show with Norm Macdonald premiered April 12, 2011. Nine ordered episodes were broadcast. Macdonald's first stand-up special, Me Doing Stand-Up, aired on Comedy Central on March 26, 2011. On February 26, 2011, he became a commentator and co-host (with Kara Scott) of the seventh season of the TV series High Stakes Poker on Game Show Network.

Early in 2012, it was reported that Macdonald was developing a talk show for TBS titled Norm Macdonald is Trending, which would see Macdonald and a team of correspondents covering headlines from pop culture and social media. Clips for the unaired pilot published by The Washington Post resemble a sketch comedy show in the vein of Back to Norm.

In June 2012, he became the spokesperson for Safe Auto Insurance Company. Along with television and radio commercials, web banners, and outdoor boards, the effort included a series of made-for-web videos. As part of the campaign, the state minimum auto insurance company introduced a new tagline, "Drive Safe, Spend Less."

2013: Norm Macdonald Live
In 2013, Macdonald premiered the podcast Norm Macdonald Live, with sidekick Adam Eget, streaming live weekly on Video Podcast Network and posted later on YouTube. It received positive notices from USA Today, Entertainment Weekly, and the "America's Comedy" website while the Independent Film Channel stated that while Macdonald remained "a comedy force to be reckoned with", and "did not quite disappoint," the show was "a bit rough around the edges." The second season of Norm Macdonald Live began in May 2014 and the third began in September 2016.

Macdonald also joined Grantland as a contributor in the first two months of 2013.

2014–2022
In 2014, Macdonald unsuccessfully campaigned on Twitter to be named the new host of The Late Late Show after then-host Craig Ferguson announced he would be leaving. On May 15, 2015, Macdonald was the final stand-up act on the Late Show with David Letterman: during his set, which ended with him breaking into tears as he told Letterman that he truly loved him, Macdonald included a joke Letterman had told the first time Macdonald had ever seen him during a 1970s appearance on the Canadian talk show 90 Minutes Live, where a 13-year-old Macdonald had been in the studio audience. Also in 2015, Macdonald was a judge for the ninth season of NBC's Last Comic Standing, joining the previous season's judges, Roseanne Barr and Keenan Ivory Wayans and replacing fellow Canadian Russell Peters from 2014.

In August 2015, he succeeded Darrell Hammond as Colonel Sanders in TV commercials for the KFC chain of fast food restaurants. Macdonald was replaced by Jim Gaffigan in the role by February 2016.

In September 2016, Macdonald's semi-fictional memoir Based on a True Story was published by Random House imprint Spiegel & Grau. It debuted at number 15 on the New York Times Best Sellers list for hardcover nonfiction, and made number 6 on the Best Sellers list for humour.

From May 2017, Macdonald moved his comedy to a more reserved, deadpan style. On stage he claimed to have "no opinions" and the minimalist delivery was described as "reduc[ing] gesture and verbiage down to an absurd minimum."

He would recur as Yaphit, the gelatinous engineer, on the Fox science fiction series The Orville, whose third season, New Horizons premiered June, 2022, and Macdonald appears posthumously.

In March 2018, Netflix announced it had ordered ten episodes of a new talk show entitled Norm Macdonald Has a Show, hosted by Macdonald. The series premiered on September 14, 2018.

In September 2018, Macdonald sparked controversy after the publication of an interview in which he appeared to criticize aspects of the #MeToo movement and defend friends and fellow comedians Louis C.K. and Roseanne Barr. Macdonald's scheduled appearance on NBC's Tonight Show Starring Jimmy Fallon was subsequently cancelled.

In February 2020, Macdonald launched Loko, a dating app he co-created which relies heavily on video to make first impressions.

That summer, he had a standup set prepared for a final Netflix special, and he taped his run through, with the intention of filming it professionally to an audience. While the proper filming never materialized, the run-through was released as Norm Macdonald: Nothing Special on May 30, 2022. The special was followed with a discussion with Dave Chappelle, Molly Shannon, David Letterman, Conan O'Brien, David Spade, and Adam Sandler.

Influences and views on comedy
Macdonald said his influences included the comedians Bob Newhart, Sam Kinison, Rodney Dangerfield, Dennis Miller, and the writers Leo Tolstoy and Anton Chekhov.

Speaking about Canada's homegrown comedy industry, Macdonald reflected that he would have liked there to have been more opportunity for him to stay in the country early in his career, stating:

Reflecting on the state of modern comedy, he bemoaned the influx of dramatic actors into comedy and comedians into dramatic acting.

While judging on Last Comic Standing, Macdonald criticised a contestant for a joke about the Harry Potter books and the Bible saying "I think if you're going to take on an entire religion, you should at least know what you're talking about" and after pointing out that JK Rowling was a Christian, he quoted her as saying "If you were familiar with the scriptures, you could easily guess the ending of my book." 

During an interview on CTV News with his sister-in-law Joyce Napier, Macdonald talked about his belief that imitation was the highest form of flattery and his distaste for the "low-hanging fruit" of Donald Trump jokes.

Personal life
In 1988, Macdonald married Connie Vaillancourt, with whom he had a son Dylan, born 1992. The couple separated in April 1999 and divorced later that same year. Macdonald reportedly dated model Elle Macpherson between 1997 and 1998.  

Macdonald had a gambling addiction that he stated was initiated by a six-figure win at a craps table in Atlantic City. In an appearance on the WTF with Marc Maron podcast in 2011, Macdonald revealed that he lost all of his money gambling three times, and the largest amount he lost at once was $400,000. It was reported by The Times that he went bankrupt twice. As a poker player, his best live result was cashing for $20,915 in the $1,000 Bellagio Weekly Tournament, in July 2006. In the 2007 World Series of Poker, he came in 20th place out of 827 entrants in the $3,000 No-Limit Texas Hold 'em event, winning $14,608. He also frequently played live cash games as well as online poker. Macdonald said in a 2018 interview that, prior to the ruling in United States v. Scheinberg, he would play up to 20 online limit hold'em games at once. "Since they went offline, it kind of saved my life. Because I was just grinding out and couldn't even sleep."

Illness, death and legacy
In 2013, Macdonald was diagnosed with multiple myeloma. He disclosed his diagnosis to only his family, agent, and producing partner, fearing that revealing his condition to the public would "affect the way he was perceived", according to his brother Neil. The cancer went into remission not long after, but returned in early 2020, metastasizing into myelodysplastic syndrome, a cancer that often develops into acute leukemia. In July 2021, Macdonald entered the City of Hope National Medical Center in Duarte, California, for a round of chemotherapy, where he developed an infection. He remained hospitalized at the City of Hope until his death from complications from acute leukemia on September 14, 2021.

Among those who expressed their sorrow over his death via social-media channels were Jim Breuer, Conan O'Brien, Dave Chappelle, Adam Sandler, David Letterman, Jay Leno, David Spade, Sarah Silverman, Artie Lange, Seth Rogen, Bob Saget, Jim Carrey, Bill Burr, Gilbert Gottfried, David Cross and multiple other fellow comedians, as well as actor Frank Stallone (whose name Macdonald used repeatedly as a non-sequitur punchline on Weekend Update), rock band Better Than Ezra, former US Senate Majority Leader Bob Dole (whom Macdonald played during his tenure at SNL) and Canadian Prime Minister Justin Trudeau. Letterman called him "[The best] in every important way, in the world of stand-up... an opinion shared by me and all peers." According to O'Brien, "Norm had the most unique comedic voice I have ever encountered and he was so relentlessly and uncompromisingly funny. I will never laugh that hard again." Both John Oliver and Lorne Michaels dedicated their victories at the 73rd Primetime Emmy Awards to Macdonald's memory. Season 3 of The Orville opened with an onscreen dedication to Macdonald.

On July 12, 2022, Macdonald was posthumously nominated for three Primetime Emmys for his standup special Norm Macdonald: Nothing Special''.

Works

Comedy

TV series

Literature

Talk shows

As performer

Film

Television

Explanatory notes

References

External links

 
 
 

 
1959 births
2021 deaths
20th-century Canadian comedians
20th-century Canadian male actors
21st-century Canadian comedians
21st-century Canadian male actors
21st-century Canadian male writers
Anglophone Quebec people
Canadian Christians
Canadian expatriate male actors in the United States
Canadian expatriate writers in the United States
Canadian impressionists (entertainers)
Canadian male comedians
Canadian male film actors
Canadian male non-fiction writers
Canadian male television actors
Canadian male voice actors
Canadian podcasters
Canadian Screen Award winners
Canadian sketch comedians
Canadian stand-up comedians
Canadian television talk show hosts
Carleton University alumni
Comedians from Quebec
Deaths from cancer in California
Deaths from leukemia
Male actors from Ottawa
Writers from Ottawa
Male actors from Quebec City
Poker commentators
Writers from Quebec City